The 2015 Major League Soccer season featured 20 total clubs (17 based in the United States, 3 based in Canada). The regular season was held from March 6 through to October 25, whereas the MLS Cup Playoffs began on October 28 and ended with MLS Cup 2015 on December 6.  The defending MLS Cup champions were the LA Galaxy, while Seattle Sounders FC were the defending Supporters' Shield winners.

It was the first season for expansion teams Orlando City and New York City, who both joined the Eastern Conference, while both the Houston Dynamo and Sporting Kansas City moved from the Eastern Conference to the Western Conference. Chivas USA folded at the end of the 2014 season.

At the end of the regular season, the New York Red Bulls of the Eastern Conference won the Supporters' Shield, while the team on top of the Western Conference was FC Dallas. The Portland Timbers won their first MLS Cup, winning 2–1 at Columbus Crew.

Overview
The 2015 season began on Friday, March 6. The opening weekend saw an average attendance of 25,838 — buoyed by strong attendances in Orlando (62,510), and Seattle (39,782) — with seven of the weekend's ten matches selling out. Additionally, MLS saw strong TV ratings on ESPN2 (539,000 viewers), Unimas (341,000 viewers), and Fox Sports 1 (289,000 and 278,500 viewers).

Franchise changes
The 2015 MLS season featured the addition of two expansion teams, New York City and Orlando City. New York City became the second MLS team in the New York metropolitan area (joining the New Jersey-based New York Red Bulls), as well as the first based within New York City itself, as the team played its inaugural season at Yankee Stadium). Orlando was a new market for MLS, which returned to Florida for the first time since folding their Miami and Tampa Bay franchises before the 2002 season.  The Lions' ownership previously owned Orlando's team that played in the league then known as USL Pro from 2010 to 2014; that team that relocated to Louisville for the 2015 season of the rebranded United Soccer League.

While MLS added two teams, one team closed down. Chivas USA, which had called the Los Angeles area home since 2005 and shared the StubHub Center with the LA Galaxy. Chivas had been owned by Mexican club, C.D. Guadalajara, who sold the club back to MLS in 2014. The league folded Chivas in October 2014, after the conclusion of the regular season, though it announced plans to add a second LA-area club, Los Angeles FC, in 2018.

Realignment and playoffs
With the addition and subtraction of the above-mentioned teams, the 2015 season saw a realignment of MLS's Eastern and Western conferences:  New York City and Orlando City joined the East, while Houston Dynamo and Sporting Kansas City moved from the East to the West.

Each team played 34 regular season matches: two or three against conference rivals and once against teams from the opposite conference.  The regular season concluded with all teams playing at the same scheduled time, a league first.

12 teams advanced to the MLS Cup Playoffs, up from 10 the previous 3 seasons. The top six teams per conference qualified. The first round per conference had the third-seed hosting the sixth-seed, and the fourth hosting the fifth. In the Conference Semifinals, the top seed played the lowest remaining seed and the second played the next-lowest.

Television
The 2015 season saw the launch of a new United States television and media rights deal with English-language ESPN and Fox Sports and Spanish-language Univision Deportes.  The deal continues MLS's relationship with ESPN and Univision, while it reestablishes one with Fox Sports, whose Fox Soccer channel carried MLS games until 2011 (NBC Sports carried MLS broadcasts from 2012 to 2014).  The deal, formally announced in May 2014, sees regular weekly game broadcasts on ESPN2 (Sunday afternoons) and Fox Sports 1 (Sunday evenings), as well as a regular Friday night match on UniMás and/or Univision Deportes Network.  The networks will share coverage of the MLS Cup Playoffs, while ESPN and Fox will alternate English language carriage of the MLS All-Star Game and MLS Cup championship match each year. The 2015 MLS all star game will be on Fox Sports, and MLS Cup 2015 will air on ESPN. As part of the deal, the networks also share coverage of the U.S. Soccer men's and women's national teams.

The league reached a four-year agreement with Sky Sports to televise league matches live in the United Kingdom and Ireland. At least two regular season matches each week, the MLS All-Star Game, and every MLS Cup Playoff match was aired on the Sky family of networks. MLS also reached a four-year agreement with Eurosport to air live matches in many other European countries.

Teams

Stadiums and locations

Personnel and sponsorship 

Note: All teams use Adidas as kit manufacturer.

Managerial changes

Regular season

Conference tables

Eastern Conference

Western Conference

Overall table

MLS Cup Playoffs

Attendance

Average home attendances

Ranked from highest to lowest average attendance.

Highest attendances 
Regular season

Updated to games played on October 25, 2015. Source: MLS Soccer

Statistics

Top scorers

Top assists

Shutouts

Hat-tricks

Awards

Monthly awards

Weekly awards

Scoring
First goal of the season: Jose Villarreal for LA Galaxy against Chicago Fire, 65 minutes (March 6, 2015)

Discipline
First yellow card of the season: Shaun Maloney for Chicago Fire against LA Galaxy, 22 minutes (March 6, 2015)
First red card of the season: Bobby Burling for Colorado Rapids against Philadelphia Union, 68 minutes (March 7, 2015) - Second yellow card
First straight red card of the season: Aurélien Collin for Orlando City against New York City, 83 minutes (March 8, 2015)

End-of-season awards

MLS Best XI

Source:

Player transfers

Allocation ranking
The allocation ranking was the mechanism used to determine which MLS club has first priority to acquire a U.S. National Team player who signs with MLS after playing abroad, or a former MLS player who returns to the league after having gone to a club abroad for a transfer fee.

MLS streamlined the allocation mechanism in the middle of 2015 season. Effective on May 1, 2015, the allocation ranking is the mechanism used to determine which MLS club has first priority to acquire a player who is in MLS allocation list. MLS allocation list contains select U.S. National Team players and players transferred outside of MLS garnering a transfer fee of at least $500,000. The allocations will be ranked in reverse order of finish for the 2014 season, taking playoff performance into account.

Once the club uses its allocation ranking to acquire a player, it drops to the bottom of the list. A ranking can be traded provided that part of the compensation received in return is another club's ranking. At all times each club is assigned one ranking. The rankings reset at the end of each MLS season.

On January 15, 2015, LA Galaxy acquired the then-number 3 allocation ranking (original ranking number 5) and allocation money from Colorado Rapids in exchange for the then-number 18 allocation ranking (original ranking number 20), Marcelo Sarvas, and an international roster slot.

On January 27, 2015, New York Red Bulls acquired the then-number 1 allocation ranking (original ranking number 3) and Felipe from Montreal Impact in exchange for the then-number 14 allocation ranking (original ranking number 17), Ambroise Oyongo, Eric Alexander, allocation money, and an international roster slot for the 2015 season.

♯ On December 19, 2014, Orlando used its original ranking to acquire Shea. Orlando used their allocation a second time when 16 teams passed and they picked Avila with the then-number 17 allocation ranking.

Coaches

Eastern Conference 
 Chicago Fire: Frank Yallop
 Columbus Crew: Gregg Berhalter
 D.C. United: Ben Olsen
 Montreal Impact: Mauro Biello
 New England Revolution: Jay Heaps
 New York City: Patrick Vieira
 New York Red Bulls: Jesse Marsch
 Orlando City: Jason Kreis
 Philadelphia Union: Jim Curtin
 Toronto: Greg Vanney

Western Conference 
 Colorado Rapids: Pablo Mastroeni
 FC Dallas: Óscar Pareja
 Houston Dynamo: Owen Coyle
 Los Angeles Galaxy: Bruce Arena
 Portland Timbers: Caleb Porter
 Real Salt Lake: Jeff Cassar
 San Jose Earthquakes: Dominic Kinnear
 Seattle Sounders FC: Sigi Schmid and Brian Schmetzer
 Sporting Kansas City: Peter Vermes
 Vancouver Whitecaps FC: Carl Robinson

References

External links

 

 
2015
1